2015 Vissel Kobe season.

J1 League

References

External links
 J.League official site

Vissel Kobe
Vissel Kobe seasons